The Hinterhoeller F3 (or F 3) is a Canadian sailboat that was designed by Argentine naval architect Germán Frers as a racer-cruiser and first built in 1981.

The F3 design moulds were later sold and the boat was developed into the Carroll Marine F36 in 1982, with a new deck and coach house design. It was later further developed into the Frers 36 and during its production run saw many changes to the rig, rudder and keel designs.

Production
The F3 was built by Hinterhoeller Yachts in Canada from 1981 to 1983, but it is now out of production.

Design
The F3 is a recreational keelboat, built predominantly of fibreglass over a balsa core. It has a masthead sloop rig with running backstays and aluminum spars, a raked stem, a raised sharp reverse transom, an internally mounted spade-type rudder controlled by a wheel and a fixed fin keel. It displaces  and carries  of lead ballast. The design incorporates features of the International Offshore Rule (IOR), without completely complying with it.

The boat is fitted with a Westerbeke  diesel engine for docking and maneuvering.

The design provides sleeping accommodation for up to eight people. There is a bow "V"-berth, two double cabin settee berths and two aft quarter berths. For racing the forward bow berth is normally used for sail storage. The galley has foot-pumped water and a three-burner propane-fuelled stove, with a refrigerator optional. There is a cockpit locker provided for dedicated propane tank storage. The is a separate navigation station amidships, with its own seat. The head is forward on the port side, just aft of the "V"-berth.

Ventilation is provided by a single forward hatch, an opening port over the head and two main cabin ports.

The cockpit is "T"-shaped, with all the lines leading to it for sail control. There are eight winches provided, four on the coach house roof got the halyards and the spinnaker, plus four cockpit winches for the genoa sheeting. Long genoa tracks are mounted inboard, which allow 8° close sheeting. The mainsheet traveller is mounted recessed into the deck just aft of the bridge deck. The toe rail is perforated and full length.

The design has a PHRF racing average handicap of 96 and an estimated IOR rating of 28.5.

Operational history
In a 1994 review Richard Sherwood wrote, "this boat has been designed for both racing and cruising. The hull and rig give a lot of consideration to the IOR without completely succumbing to it. Neither is radical. While the boat is suited for cruising, the interior has certain features that are meant for racing. Balance, in particular, has been emphasized."

See also
List of sailing boat types

Similar sailboats
Bayfield 36
C&C 36-1
C&C 36R
Catalina 36
Columbia 36
Crealock 37
CS 36
Ericson 36
Frigate 36
Hunter 36
Invader 36
Portman 36
S2 11.0
Seidelmann 37
Watkins 36
Watkins 36C

References

Keelboats
1980s sailboat type designs
Sailing yachts
Sailboat type designs by Germán Frers
Sailboat types built by Hinterhoeller Yachts